Fort James Jackson (usually shortened to Fort Jackson and informally known as Old Fort Jackson) is a restored nineteenth-century fort located one mile east of Savannah, Georgia, on the Savannah River.  It hosts the Fort Jackson Maritime Museum.

Named in honor of James Jackson (1757–1806), a British-born political figure in Georgia, Fort Jackson was constructed between 1808 and 1812 to protect the city of Savannah from attack by sea. During the American Civil War, it became one of three Confederate forts that defended Savannah from Union forces (the other two were Fort McAllister and Fort Pulaski). In 1862, Fort Jackson came under shelling from a ship captained by an escaped slave, Robert Smalls.

When the Union army commanded by William T. Sherman captured Savannah by land in December 1864, it took Fort Jackson almost immediately. The fort went by the name of Fort Oglethorpe between 1884 and 1905, and was little used by the U.S. military. It was purchased by the city of Savannah in 1924 for park purposes and was fully restored in the 1970s. It was declared a National Historic Landmark in 2000.

Fort Jackson is located at 1 Fort Jackson Road, on the Islands Expressway linking Savannah to Fort Pulaski and the town of Tybee Island.  Fort Jackson is owned by the state of Georgia and operated as a museum by the Coastal Heritage Society.  In the summer the fort has a daily cannon-firing demonstration.

See also
Battle of Fort Pulaski, Background, defense in depth.

References

External links

 

National Historic Landmarks in Georgia (U.S. state)
National Register of Historic Places in Savannah, Georgia
James Jackson
Museums in Savannah, Georgia
Historical society museums in Georgia (U.S. state)
Military and war museums in Georgia (U.S. state)